is a railway station on the Nankai Kōya Line in Naniwa-ku, Osaka, Osaka Prefecture, Japan, operated by the private railway operator Nankai Electric Railway.

Line
Imamiyaebisu Station is served by the Nankai Kōya Line. It is numbered "NK02".

Layout
Imamiyaebisu is an elevated station with one island platform serving the two easternmost tracks of the four-track right-of-way. Strictly speaking, it belongs to the Nankai Main Line, but only local Koya Line trains stop at this station.

Platforms

Adjacent stations

Surroundings
 Imamiya Ebisu Shrine
 Kubota Head office
 Osaka Municipal Subway Daikokuchō Station
 Osaka Municipal Subway and Hankai Tramway Hankai Line Ebisuchō Station
 
 Shinsekai
 Tsūtenkaku
 Denden Town

See also
 List of railway stations in Japan

References

External links

  

Railway stations in Japan opened in 1937
Railway stations in Osaka Prefecture